Arthur van Schendel (15 March 1874 in Batavia, Dutch East Indies – 11 September 1946 in Amsterdam) was a Dutch writer of novels and short stories. One of his best known works is Het fregatschip Johanna Maria. His son Arthur F.E. van Schendel (1910–1979) was General Director of the Rijksmuseum Amsterdam from 1959–1975.

Prizes
1931 – C.W. van der Hoogtprijs for Het fregatschip Johanna Maria
1933 – Tollensprijs for his entire oeuvre
1947 – P.C. Hooftprijs for Het oude huis

Bibliography

 1896 – Drogon
 1904 – Een zwerver verliefd (A Wanderer in Love)
 1907 – Een zwerver verdwaald (A Lost Wanderer)
 1908 – De schoone jacht (The beautiful hunt)
 1910 – Shakespeare 
 1913 – De berg van droomen (The mountain of dreams)
 1916 – De mensch van Nazareth (The human of Nazareth)
 1919 – Pandorra
 1920 – Tristan en Isolde
 1921 – Der liefde bloesems (About the love of blossoms)
 1922 – Rose Angélique, de droomers van de liefde (Rose Angélique, the dreamers of love)
 1923 – Angiolio en de lente (Angiolio and spring)
 1923 – Blanke gestalten (White shapes)
 1924 – Oude Italiaansche steden (Old Italian cities)
 1925 – Verdichtsel van zomerdagen (Poetry of summer days)
 1926 – Verlaine
 1927 – Maneschijn (Moonlight)
 1927 – Merona, een edelman (Merona, a nobleman)
 1928 – Fratilamur
 1929 – Florentijnsche verhalen (Florentinian stories)
 1930 – Het fregatschip Johanna Maria (roman) (The frigate Johanna Maria)
 1931 – Een eiland in de Zuidzee (An island in the South Sea)
 1932 – Jan Compagnie (John Company)
 1933 – De waterman (The waterman)
 1934 – Herinneringen van een dommen jongen (Memories of a silly boy)
 1935 – Een Hollandsch drama (A Dutch drama)
 1936 – De rijke man (The rich man)
 1937 – De grauwe vogels (The ashen birds)
 1938 – De wereld een dansfeest (The world a ball)
 1938 – Nachtgedaanten (Nightshapes)
 1939 – Anders en eender (Different and equal)
 1939 – De zeven tuinen (roman) (The seven gardens)
 1940 – Mijnheer Oberon en Mevrouw (Mister Oberon and Miss)
 1941 – De menschenhater (roman) (The men hater)
 1942 – Een spel der natuur (A game of nature)
 1942 – De wedergeboorte van Bedelman (collection) (The rebirth of Bedelman)
 1946 – De Nederlanden (poem) (The Netherlands)
 1946 – Het oude huis (roman) (The old house)
 1948 – Voorbijgaande schaduwen (Passing shadows)
 1976 – Verzameld werk (1976–1978, 1983) (Collected work)

External links
 
 
Biografie in de Digitale Bibliotheek voor de Nederlandse Letteren
English-language article on Dutch literature including analysis of van Schendel's main works

1874 births
1946 deaths
People from Batavia, Dutch East Indies
Dutch male writers
P. C. Hooft Award winners
Dutch people of the Dutch East Indies